Events from the year 1634 in art.

Events
 (unknown)

Works

Claude Lorrain
Coast Scene with Europa and the Bull (Kimbell Art Museum, Fort Worth, Texas)
Goats (etching)
Nicolas Poussin
The Adoration of the Golden Calf
The Crossing of the Red Sea
Rembrandt
Artemisia
The Descent from the Cross
Diana Bathing with her Nymphs with Actaeon and Callisto
Flora
Joseph and Potiphar's Wife (etching)
Pendant portraits of Maerten Soolmans and Oopjen Coppit
Peter Paul Rubens - The Adoration of the Magi (for Convent of the White Nuns, Leuven; now in King's College Chapel, Cambridge)
Anthony van Dyck 
Magistrates of Brussels (destroyed 1695)
Deposition (Alte Pinakothek)
Henri II de Lorraine, duc de Guise (approximate date; National Gallery of Art, Washington, D.C.)
Diego Velázquez
Doña Antonia de Ipeñarrieta y Galdós and Her Son Don Luis
Equestrian Portrait of Margarita of Austria
Equestrian Portrait of the Count-Duke of Olivares

Births
January - Nicolaes Maes, Dutch painter of genre works and portraits (died 1693)
February 5 - Dancker Danckerts, Dutch engraver and publisher (died 1666)
October 18 - Luca Giordano, Italian painter and printmaker in etching (died 1705)
date unknown
Philippe Caffieri, Italian decorative sculptor (died 1716)
Adam Colonia, Dutch painter working in England (died 1688)
Tommaso Costa, Italian painter (died 1690)
Francesco Ferrari, Italian painter and architect of the Baroque period (died 1708)
Ciro Ferri, Italian sculptor and painter (died 1689)
Giuseppe Ghezzi, Italian painter of the Baroque period, active mainly in Rome (died 1721)
Juan Simón Gutiérrez, Spanish Baroque painter (died 1718)
Jacob Levecq, Dutch Golden Age painter (died 1675)
Bartolomé Pérez, Spanish painter of flowers and still lifes (died 1693)
Francesco Pianta, Italian sculptor (died 1690)
Jan-Erasmus Quellinus, Flemish Baroque painter of large altarpieces and histories (died 1715)
Giuseppe Recco, Italian painter (died 1695)
Ludovico Trasi, Italian painter, born and active in Ascoli Piceno (died 1694)
Egbert van Heemskerck, Dutch painter, also known as Egbert van Heemskerck the Elder (died 1704)
probable - Eglon van der Neer, Dutch painter of portraits and elegant, fashionable people, and later of landscapes (died 1703)

Deaths
May 
Hendrick Avercamp, painter (born 1585)
Hans Krumpper, sculptor and plasterer (born 1570)
November 23 - Wenceslas Cobergher, Flemish Renaissance architect, engineer, painter, antiquarian, numismatist and economist (born 1560)
December 15 - Eugenio Caxés, Spanish painter (born 1577)
date unknown
Benedetto Bandiera, Italian painter (born 1557/1560)
Johan Bara, Dutch painter, designer and engraver (born 1581)
Ippolito Buzzi, Italian sculptor (born 1562)
Cornelis Danckerts de Ry, Dutch architect and sculptor (born 1561)
Epiphanius Evesham, British sculptor (born 1570)
Johann Matthias Kager, German painter (born 1566)
Johannes Moreelse, Dutch painter (born 1603)
Juan Zariñena, Spanish painter (born 1545)

 
Years of the 17th century in art
1630s in art